KWRK may refer to:

 KWRK (FM), a radio station (96.1 FM) licensed to serve Window Rock, Arizona, United States
 KWRK-LP, a low-power radio station (90.9 FM) licensed to serve Fairbanks, Alaska, United States